Jitendra Kumar Gothwal is an Indian politician and current Member of the Rajasthan Legislative Assembly from Khandar Sawai Madhopur in Rajasthan. He is a Bharatiya Janata Party politician.

References

Rajasthani politicians
Living people
1973 births